Jeffrey Alan Combs (born September 9, 1954) is an American actor. He is known for starring in horror films, such as Re-Animator, and appearances playing a number of characters in the Star Trek and the DC animated universe television franchises.

Early life
Combs was born in Oxnard, California, the fifth of nine children born to Jean Owens (formerly Sullins; 1921–1986) and Eugene "Gene" Combs (1922–1999), and raised in Lompoc. Both of his parents were from the Ozarks region of Arkansas. A graduate of Lompoc High School, as a senior, Combs played the lead role of Captain Fisby in a stage production of The Teahouse of the August Moon. Combs then attended Santa Maria's Pacific Conservatory of the Performing Arts, and later developed his acting skills in the Professional Actor's Training Program at the University of Washington.

In 1980, after spending several years performing in playhouses on the West Coast, Combs moved to Los Angeles. He landed his first role in the film Honky Tonk Freeway (1981), in which he played an unnamed drive-in teller. His first horror film role came two years later in Frightmare (1983).

Career
Combs's best-known horror role is Herbert West, the main character in the film Re-Animator (1985), and its two sequels. He portrayed author H. P. Lovecraft (creator of the Herbert West character) in the film Necronomicon: Book of the Dead (1993) and has starred in eight H.P. Lovecraft adaptations. Other film credits include The Attic Expeditions (2001), FeardotCom (2002), House on Haunted Hill (1999), I Still Know What You Did Last Summer (1998), and The Frighteners (1996).

Combs has had roles in many science fiction television series. He starred as the telepath Harriman Gray in first-season episode "Eyes" (1994) of Babylon 5. In 2001, he played the sinister Dr. Ek in The Attic Expeditions. In August 2005, he appeared for the first time on the science fiction series The 4400 as Dr. Kevin Burkhoff which had become a recurring role by 2006. In early 2007, he played a highly fictionalized Edgar Allan Poe in "The Black Cat" episode of Masters of Horror. In the 2012 miniseries Dorothy and the Witches of Oz (sometimes called The Witches of Oz), he had a small role as a highly fictionalized L. Frank Baum.

Combs has worked extensively as a voiceover artist. His voiceover roles include the Scarecrow in The New Batman Adventures, the Question in Justice League Unlimited, Ratchet in Transformers: Prime, the Leader in The Avengers: Earth's Mightiest Heroes, the Rat King in Teenage Mutant Ninja Turtles and Brainiac in Injustice 2. He also narrated the 25th Anniversary of Re-Animator at the 2010 FanTasia.

In July 2009, Combs returned to his stage roots and reprised his role as Edgar Allan Poe in a one-man theatrical show entitled Nevermore...an Evening with Edgar Allan Poe at The Steve Allen Theater in Hollywood, California. Although only supposed to run for a month, the show enjoyed much success and sold-out crowds, and was extended four times. Nevermore as it is now simply known, closed its run in Los Angeles on December 19, 2009. The show had its East Coast debut on January 23 and 24, 2010 at Westminster Hall in Baltimore, MD, Poe's final resting place. A tour of the Saturn Award nominated Nevermore is now in the works, with stops possibly including Chicago, New York, and Seattle, and a confirmed two-date run in San Diego in February.

Combs starred with Andrew Divoff in the 2012 Screen Media Films release Night of the Living Dead 3D: Re-Animation, a prequel to the 2006 film Night of the Living Dead 3D directed by Jeff Broadstreet. In 2012, he also played the sadistic Dr. Lambrick in another horror-thriller, Would You Rather.

Star Trek
On television, Combs enjoyed popular success playing a number of alien characters on the various modern Star Trek incarnations, beginning with Star Trek: Deep Space Nine in 1994, and continuing to Star Trek: Voyager in 2000, Star Trek: Enterprise in 2001 and Star Trek: Lower Decks in 2021. Combs has played nine different onscreen roles in the Star Trek universe. His largest science-fiction role to date was his regular guest role on Deep Space Nine as the Vorta clone Weyoun.  Combs has said that Weyoun was his favorite Star Trek role, and he had a great deal of input in developing the character.

On the same series, Combs had a recurring role as the Ferengi character Brunt. During the DS9 episode "The Dogs of War", Combs appeared as both Weyoun and Brunt, becoming one of only three Star Trek actors ever to play two unrelated characters in the same episode. (The others being Patrick Stewart and Brian Markinson.) Combs wanted the characters to appear in the same scene together, but the logistics and expense worked against it.

On Enterprise, Combs had a recurring role as Shran, an Andorian military officer.  Enterprise producer Manny Coto once mentioned in an interview that he had hoped to make Combs a regular on Enterprise had the series been renewed for a fifth season.

In addition to his recurring Star Trek roles, Combs had non-recurring roles as a human police officer Kevin Mulkahey, as the alien Tiron on Deep Space Nine; as the alien Penk on Voyager; and as the Ferengi pirate Krem on Enterprise. Along with many other actors, writers, and creators of the show, Combs also had a cameo appearance as a holographic patron in Vic's Lounge in the final episode of Deep Space Nine. Combs also voices the character of Romulan Commander Suldok for the Star Trek: Elite Force II video game. In 2021, Combs had a guest voice role as AGIMUS, an evil computer, in the episode 7, season 2 of Star Trek: Lower Decks.

Filmography

Film

Television

Video games

References

Bibliography
Voisin, Scott, Character Kings: Hollywood's Familiar Faces Discuss the Art & Business of Acting BearManor Media, 2009. .

External links

 
 

1954 births
20th-century American male actors
21st-century American male actors
Male actors from Los Angeles
American male film actors
American male stage actors
American male television actors
American male voice actors
Living people
Pacific Conservatory of the Performing Arts alumni
People from Lompoc, California
Male actors from Oxnard, California
University of Washington School of Drama alumni